Mikhail Vasilyevich Golovatov (23 August 1949 – 1 August 2022) was a Russian intelligence officer.

In 1965, Golovatov enrolled at the N. N. Godovikov Moscow Aviation College. He worked at the  until 1972. Golovatov was a member of the sports and fitness society Dynamo Sports Club from 1965 to 1971. He worked with the KGB. In 1984, Golovatov was dispatched to Khabarovsk, where he established the regional branch of the KGB's Alpha Group. He was later commander of Alpha Group.

In 2011, Golovatov was arrested at Vienna International Airport by Austrian police, having been placed on the European Arrest Warrant by Lithuania for his role in the events of 13 January 1991. The Lithuanian government was informed, but Austrian authorities released him within 24 hours, claiming that the information provided by Lithuania was "too vague". On 27 March 2019, the District Court of Vilnius found Golovatov guilty of war crimes and crimes against humanity for his role in the events of 13 January 1991. The panel of three judges sentenced Golovatov in absentia to 12 years in prison. 

Golovatov died in August 2022, at the age of 72.

References 

1949 births
2022 deaths
Recipients of the Order of Honour (Russia)
Recipients of the Order of the Red Star
Recipients of the Medal "For Courage" (Russia)
Recipients of the Order of the Red Banner
KGB officers
Soviet colonels